Birdsong is a Michelin Guide-starred restaurant in San Francisco, in the U.S. state of California.

References 

Michelin Guide starred restaurants in California
Restaurants in San Francisco